Sex reversal is a biological process whereby the pathway directed towards the already determined-sex fate is flipped towards the opposite sex, creating a discordance between the primary sex fate and the sex phenotype expressed.  The process of sex reversal occurs during embryonic development or before gonad differentiation. In GSD species sex reversal means that the sexual phenotype is discordant with the genetic/chromosomal sex. In TSD species sex reversal means that the temperature/conditions that usually trigger the differentiation towards one sexual phenotype are producing the opposite sexual phenotype.

Sex reversal can occur naturally, by mutations, or can be induced artificially. Sex reversal can be genetically or hormonally induced in laboratory. It can also occur artificially by exposure to endocrine disruptors such as pollutants, including herbicides, which can act as estrogen promoters or inhibitors, for instance by altering aromatase expression.

In vertebrates

In gonochoristic fishes 
In gonochoristic fishes, the sex can be determined genetically, environmentally or by a combination of both. In fishes, primary sexual fate can be susceptible to alteration by hormones exposure and multiple environmental factors, such as population density, water pH, or temperature. Those conditions can affect the gonad development and differentiation, which can lead to sex reversal.  In medaka fish, where sex reversal has been documented show a shared gene related to normal male development, the dmy gene. In wild populations, genetically female fate can be phenotypically reversed to males if they carry the dmy gene or a mutated dmy gene and genetic males can be reversed to females if they lack the dmy gene.

Induced reversal in aquaculture industry 
In aquaculture, sex control is important due to the role of sex in growth and reproduction. In fishes, growth rates can be different between sexes. These differences can affect their economic value. Producing a monosex fish population can improve product quality and therefore generates higher financial profit.

Hormone-induced sex reversal is the most frequent method used in aquaculture. It consists of exposing sexually undifferentiated fishes to sex steroids. There are other methods to induced sex reversal in fishes such as chromosomal/genetic manipulation, hybridization, or  treatments influencing sex determination or gonad differentiation (e.g. temperature, population density, pH, social factors).

In amphibians 
Sex is genetically determined in amphibians.  Temperature-induced sex reversal has been documented in some species of anuran and caudate amphibians. Temperature only can have an effect on sex differentiation during a window period called thermosensitive period (TSP) which varies among species. Tadpoles or larvae exposed to specific higher or lower temperatures, depending on the temperature thresholds of the species, can differentiate gonads that do not align with their primary sexual fate.

Amphibian sex reversal can be also induced by exposure to sex steroid and pollutants. Endocrine disruptors can affect gonad differentiation, and therefore induce sex reversal. Exposure to ethylnyl estradiol (EE2) and bisphenol A (BPA) induces feminizing effects. Masculinizing effects can be induced by exposure to the drug trenbolone, used in cattle.

Research  in wild populations of the North American green frog has demonstrated that sex reversal is common. This work shows that genetic females sex reverse into phenotypic males and that genetic males sex reverse into phenotypic females, providing evidence that sex reversal can be bidirectional in amphibians. While endocrine disrupting chemical contamination is known from laboratory experiments to cause sex reversal in amphibians, sex reversal in green frogs occurs irrespective of contamination, suggesting sex reversal is a natural process in amphibians

In reptiles 
Sex in reptiles can be determined genetically (GSD), environmentally (ESD) or by an interaction of both. In these species, their genetically determined sex is overridden by temperature influence.

Sex reversal in reptiles can be induced by hormonal manipulation, treatments influencing sex determination (e.g. temperature) or by inhibition of the aromatase gene (CYP19A1) which causes sex reversal from female to male phenotype.

In birds 
In birds, sex reversal has been documented in natural and experimental conditions. Sex steroid manipulation can induced sex reversal in birds. Aromatase inhibitors injected into chicken eggs before the gonadal differentiation stage induce testis development in ZW embryos.

In mammals 
Sex reversal in mammals has been documented in domestic species such as cattle, water buffalo, horses, dogs, cats, pigs, goats, etc. Sex reversal in these species usually relates to genetic changes and the resulting phenotype is often associated with gonadal malformation. Natural sex reversal without disruptive effects on fertility has been documented in several rodents, including Myopus schisticolor, Dicrostonyx torquatus, Akodon, Mus minutoides, Microtus cabrerae. In these species some individuals genetically determined as males develop typical ovarian structure. In these rodents species, sex reversal mainly occurs after mutational events.

See also 
 Sequential hermaphroditism

References 

Embryology
Sexuality